An audio router is a device that transports audio signals from inputs to outputs.

Inputs and Outputs 

The number of inputs and outputs varies dramatically. The way routers are described is normally number of inputs by number of outputs e.g. 2x1, 256x256.

Signals 

The type of signals transported - switched can be analogue - Analog -  audio signals or Digital. Digital audio usually is in the AES/EBU standard for broadcast use. Broadband routers can route more than one signal type e.g. analogue or more than one type of digital.

Crosspoints 

Because any of the inputs can be routed to any output, the internal arrangement of the router is arranged as a number of crosspoints which can be activated to pass the corresponding signal to the desired output.

Some Manufacturers of audio routers
 Lawo
 Datavideo
 Imagine Communications
 AEQ
 FOR-A
 Klotz Digital
 NVISION
 Panasonic
 Philips
 Ross Video
 Snell & Wilcox
 Sony
 Thomson Grass Valley
 Utah Scientific
 Matrix Switch Corporation

See also
Video router
Vision mixer

Television technology
Television terminology